¡Viva México! - Alma insurgente, El grito de Dolores ("Viva Mexico! (The Cry of Delores)") is a 1934 Mexican film about the events that caused the Mexican War of Independence. It stars Sara García.

Cast

 Paco Martínez
 Sara García
 Alberto Martí
 Joaquín Busquets
 José Cortés
 Rodolfo Navarrete
 Paquita Estrada
 Jesús Melgarejo
 Alfonso Patiño Gómez
 Emma Roldán

External links
 
¡Viva México! - Alma insurgente, El grito de Dolores.

1934 films
1934 drama films
Mexican black-and-white films
Mexican drama films
Mexican War of Independence films
1930s Spanish-language films
1930s Mexican films